Rukometni klub Sutjeska is a Montenegrin handball club from Nikšić. RK Sutjeska is former Cup winner of Montenegro.

History

RK Sutjeska was formed at 1949, and during the decades played in the Montenegrin Republic League, and in the Second Yugoslav League.

Biggest successes, Sutjeska made after the Montenegrin independence, when they became a members of the First League. At their first season in that competition (2006/07), Sutjeska won the third place, with first placement to the European cups. A year later, Sutjeska made their historical result – winning the Cup of Montenegro in Danilovgrad.

Until 2014, together with Lovćen Cetinje, Sutjeska was the only club which competed in every season of the Montenegrin First League. But, before the 2014/15 season, the club withdrew from the First League, because of financial difficulties. After 8 years in the season 2021/22 Sutjeska back in the First League.

Trophies

Winner of the Montenegrin Cup (1) 
 2008.

Supporters and rivalries
"The Dukes" (Vojvode) is the popular name for the most ardent Sutjeska fans. They have been established as an NGO in 1988 in Nikšić and today constitute one of the most numerous groups of supporters in Montenegro. They traditionally follow all the matches of all sports that compete under the "Sutjeska" name, both home and away matches. The biggest Sutjeska rival is RK Budućnost Podgorica, as the "Barbarians" (Varvari) are the other large group of supporters in the country.

First League seasons

RK Sutjeska played in the Montenegrin First League during the seasons 2006/07, 2007/08, 2008/09, 2009/10, 2010/11, 2011/12, 2012/13, 2013/14, 2021/22.

Participation in the SEHA League

Except Lovćen, which is a permanent member of the Regional SEHA League, Sutjeska is the only other Montenegrin club which participated in that competition. Sutjeska played in the SEHA league 2011/12 and finished the season at the 10 od 12 places of the table.

In that season, Sutjeska played against CO Zagreb (30:33, 27:37), Tatran Prešov (20:26, 22:42), Vardar Skopje (24:29, 23:33), Metalurg Skopje (22:28, 23:31), Nexe Našice (17:32, 19:32), Lovćen Cetinje (20:26, 22:31), Borac Banja Luka (22:32, 20:23), Metaloplastika Šabac (20:22), Izviđač Ljubuški (19:19, 27:29), Bosna Sarajevo (23:17, 24:30) and Crvena zvezda Beograd (29:22, 21:20).

European Cups

Sutjeska played five seasons in the EHF European competitions:

2007/08 – EHF Cup

2008/09 – EHF Cup Winners' Cup

2009/10 – EHF Cup

2011/12 – EHF Cup

2012/13 – EHF Challenge Cup

Matches

Famous players

 Rade Mijatović
 Ivan Nikčević
 Alen Muratović
 Goran Đukanović
 Marko Lasica

References

Sutjeska
Handball clubs established in 1949
1949 establishments in Yugoslavia
Nikšić